The second season of The Misfit of Demon King Academy: History's Strongest Demon King Reincarnates and Goes to School with His Descendants, titled The Misfit of Demon King Academy II, is an anime series based on the light novels series of the same title written by Shu and illustrated by Yoshinori Shizuma. On March 6, 2021, it was announced that the series would receive a second split-cour season with the staff and cast reprising their respective roles. Yūichirō Umehara replaced Tatsuhisa Suzuki as the voice of Anos Voldigoad for the second season. The first cour premiered on January 8, 2023. On February 11, 2023, it was announced that the seventh episode of the season and beyond would be postponed due to COVID-19.


Episode list

Notes

References

External links
  
  
 

2023 Japanese television seasons
Misfit of Demon King Academy (season 2)